Fabrice Santoro was the defending champion, but lost in the semifinals to Sam Querrey.

Rajeev Ram won the title, defeating Querrey 6–7(3–7), 7–5, 6–3 in the final.

Seeds

Draw

Finals

Top half

Bottom half

Qualifying

Seeds

Qualifiers

Lucky loser

Draw

First qualifier

Second qualifier

Third qualifier

Fourth qualifier

External links
Main Draw
Qualifying Draw

Singles